Australhypopus is a genus of mites in the family Acaridae.

Species
 Australhypopus flagellifer Fain & Friend, 1984

References

Acaridae